Red belt may refer to:

 Red Belt (Pennsylvania), Allegheny County road belt system
 Red Belt (Pittsburgh), Allegheny County road belt system
 Red belt (martial arts)
 Red belt (Brazilian Jiu-Jitsu)
 Red-Belted Clearwing, the European name of Synanthedon myopaeformis
 Redbelt, 2008 American film

Left-leaning areas 
 Red Belt (Russia), area dominated by the Communist Party of the Russian Federation 
 Red belt (Italy), area dominated by the PSI, PCI, PDS and PD
 Red belt (Community of Madrid)
 Red belt (India), the area where Maoist insurgency operates
 Ceinture rouge, around Paris, France.